Family of Improved Load Bearing Equipment (FILBE) is a series of equipment used by the United States Marine Corps for personal load carrying.  It comprises the backpack and various attachments carried by an individual Marine in the field.  The FILBE was designed as an improvement over the prior ILBE system that was not compatible with the newest body armor systems.

The FILBE consists of the following components:

 USMC Pack System
 Main Pack, NSN 8465-01-598-7693
Frame, NSN 8465-01-600-7844
Shoulder Harness Assembly, NSN 8465-01-600-7938
Hip belt, NSN 8465-01-600-7870
Main Bag
 Assault Pack
 Assault Pouch
 Sustainment Pouch (qty. 2)
 Hydration Pouch (qty. 2)
 Hydration Carrier
 Hydration Bladder System (CamelBak)
100 oz. Hydration Bladder
Tube Kit
Tube Holder
Hydration Bite Valve with Cover
 Sternum Cinch
 Sub-Belt (known as "Girth Hip Belt")
 Repair kit
Toaste Ellipse Cordloc
Grimloc
GTLL Split-bar
1" Male Techno Grab (qty. 2)
1" Female Snap-on Repairable (qty. 2)
 USMC Pack Instruction Card
 Chest Rig
 USMC Chest Rig Assembly
 Harness Assembly
 USMC Chest Rig Repair Kit
Attaching Strap Assembly (for MTV/SPC)(2 pair)
IMTV/PC Attaching Strap Assembly (2 pair)
1" Quick Attach Surface Mount (6 each)
1" Single Bar Repairable, Male (2 each)
1" Waveloc Repairable, Female (2 each)
1" Waveloc Repairable, Male (2 each)
 USMC Chest Rig Instruction Card
 USMC Equipment Pouches
 9mm 15 Round Magazine pouch
 M16/M4 Speed Reload Magazine pouch
 M16/M4 Single/Double Magazine pouch
 40mm Grenade pouch
 Pop-up Flare pouch
 M67 Grenade pouch
 Squad Automatic Weapon (SAW)/Utility pouch
 12 Gauge Shotgun Shell pouch
 Multi Grenade pouch
 Dump pouch
USMC Holster
USMC Corpsman Assault System
 Medical Assault Pack
 Medical Sustainment Bag
 Modular Medical Pouch
 Medical Thigh Rig
 Medical Inserts
Narc Pouch
Medium Pouch (Qty. 2)
Large Pouch (Qty. 2)
Small Reversible Pouch (Qty. 2)
Medium Reversible Pouch (Qty. 2)
Elastic Panel (Qty. 2)
Double Pocket Panel
Triple Pocket Panel
Stacked Pocket Panel
Individual Water Purification System

See also 
 All-purpose Lightweight Individual Carrying Equipment (ALICE)
 Improved Load Bearing Equipment (ILBE)
 Interceptor Body Armor (IBA)
 List of United States Marine Corps individual equipment
 Modular Lightweight Load-carrying Equipment (MOLLE)

External links 
 “Purchase Description, Family of Improved Load Bearing Equipment” (draft), United States Army Natick Soldier Research, Development and Engineering Center, Natick, Massachusetts  (1 May 2012)  (retrieved 30 June 2014)

References

United States Marine Corps equipment
Personal military carrying equipment